Science Friction: Where the Known Meets the Unknown is a 2004 book by Michael Shermer, a historian of science and founder of The Skeptics Society. It contains thirteen essays about "personal barriers and biases that plague and propel science, especially when scientists push against the unknown. What do we know, and what do we not know?" These include an essay relating the author's experience of a day spent learning cold reading techniques well enough to be accepted as a psychic. As well as covering skepticism and pseudoscience, Shermer discusses other topics touching on the subject of encouraging scientific thought, such as sport psychology and the writings of Stephen Jay Gould. Shermer attributes the founding of the skeptical movement to Martin Gardner's 1950 article "The Hermit Scientist" in the Antioch Review.

References

External links
Science Friction from MichaelShermer.com

2004 non-fiction books
Books about the paranormal
Books by Michael Shermer
English-language books
Popular science books